Kim So-yeon (born November 2, 1980) is a South Korean actress. She is best known for starring in a number of well-known television dramas, notably All About Eve (2000), Iris (2009), Prosecutor Princess (2010), Happy Home (2016), and The Penthouse: War in Life (2020–2021).

Career
When she was 14, Kim So-yeon entered the Miss Binggrae beauty pageant without her parents' approval. She had no makeup, so she used a marker pen as her eyeliner and ended up winning the top prize thus launching her entertainment career. She debuted with a role in the SBS Drama Dinosaur Teacher, and continued to star in popular TV shows such as Reporting for Duty (1996) and Soonpoong Clinic (1998). Because of her preternaturally mature looks and poise, she was often cast in older roles notably as a manipulative, villainous, anchorwoman in All About Eve, which drew a peak viewership rating of 45.2% when it aired in 2000.

However, being typecast as prim, cold-hearted characters had a negative effect on Kim's career, and her fame went downhill in the mid-2000s. Her attempt to crossover to China via Hong Kong director Tsui Hark's wuxia film Seven Swords (in which she played a Joseon noblewoman-turned-slave) and the Chinese dramas Just Like a Beautiful Flying Butterfly and Anhui Merchants also proved unsuccessful. Kim took a break for three years, questioning whether she wanted to continue being an actress. She returned to television in 2008 with Gourmet (adapted from Huh Young-man's titular manhwa).

A year later, Kim's career saw a resurgence with the 2009 high-budget series Iris. She cut her trademark long hair and worked hard on her action scenes in order to look convincing in her role as a North Korean spy, drawing praise for her portrayal of a tough woman conflicted about her loyalty to her country and her love for a South Korean agent. 

Kim was cast in the leading role in romantic comedy Prosecutor Princess in 2010 and showcased her versatility by playing a Legally Blonde-inspired newbie district attorney who's initially more interested in shopping and dating, yet surprises her colleagues with her intelligence and learns to strive for justice. Kim said that the cheerful, unpredictable character was similar to her own real-life personality. Later in the year, she played a rigid doctor in sports drama Dr. Champ.

In 2012, Kim appeared on the big screen as a royal barista embroiled in a plot to assassinate Emperor Gojong in Gabi, adapted from the historical fiction novel by Kim Takhwan. She spent months studying the Russian language and coffee brewing even before shooting began. Gabi was Kim's first Korean feature film in 15 years, since Change in 1997. This was followed by another period drama The Great Seer, where she played a healer in Goryeo.

Kim reunited with Prosecutor Princess screenwriter So Hyun-kyung in Two Weeks (2013), in the role of a prosecutor who teams up with a fugitive to bring down a corrupt politician and her gangster henchman. 
In 2014, she played a fashion merchandiser who falls for her much younger childhood friend in I Need Romance 3. Kim then appeared in the "Female Soldier Special" of military boot camp reality show Real Men.

In 2015, she starred in her second cable series Beating Again, about a businessman who falls for his secretary after he gets a heart transplant. Kim also joined the fourth season of We Got Married, pairing up with Kwak Si-yang.

In 2016, Kim starred MBC's weekend drama Happy Home, playing a mother who has lost her son in an accident.

In March 2018, Kim left her previous agency Namoo Actors and signed an exclusive contract with J Wide Company on April 3, 2018. She was then cast in SBS weekend drama Secret Mother.

In March 2019, Kim returned to small screen with the KBS weekend drama Mother of Mine.

In 2020, she starred in the SBS TV series The Penthouse: War in Life, playing the role of a wicked but famous soprano and musical school director. Kim compared the role to her famous villain role in All About Eve 20 years earlier, commenting "The goal for this drama is that when people think of a female villain, they think of Cheon Seo-jin, just like how Heo Young-mi was remembered." The series drew a peak viewership rating of 28.8% nationwide, and was renewed for 2 more seasons, where Kim reprised her role. Additionally, Kim won the Award for Best Actress – Television at the 57th Baeksang Arts Awards and the Grand Prize (Daesang) at 2021 SBS Drama Awards.

Personal life
Kim married actor Lee Sang-woo in June 2017. Their romantic relationship started in 2016. The pair met on the set of MBC's weekend drama Happy Home.

Filmography

Film

Television series

Web series

Television show

Music videos appearances

Theater

Ambassadorship 
 Government Lottery Ambassador (2021)

Awards and nominations

Listicles

References

External links

 Official website 
 
 
 

20th-century South Korean actresses
21st-century South Korean actresses
South Korean television actresses
South Korean film actresses
South Korean stage actresses
Dongguk University alumni
Actresses from Seoul
1980 births
Living people
Best Actress Paeksang Arts Award (television) winners